This is a list of diplomatic missions of Gabon, excluding honorary consulates.

Current missions

Africa

Americas

Asia

Europe

Multilateral organizations

Gallery

Closed missions

Asia

See also
Foreign relations of Gabon
List of diplomatic missions in Gabon
Visa policy of Gabon

Notes

References

External links
Ministry of Foreign Affairs of Gabon

 
Gabon
Diplomatic missions